James Patrick Westlake (July 3, 1930 – January 3, 2003) was a Major League Baseball player. In one game, Westlake had no hits in one career at-bat. He batted and threw left-handed. His brother is former player Wally Westlake.

Baseball career
Jim graduated from C. K. McClatchy High School in Sacramento, CA in 1948. He had one at bat for the Philadelphia Phillies on April 16, 1955 at the Polo Grounds in New York City against the New York Giants (baseball). He came into the game as a pinch-hitter in the top of the 9th inning as the first batter hitting for relief pitcher Jack Spring. Jim Hearn was the pitcher for the Giants and struck out Westlake in his only Major League at-bat.

Westlake was born and died in Sacramento, California.

External links

1930 births
2003 deaths
Baseball players from Sacramento, California
Philadelphia Phillies players
American expatriate baseball players in Canada
Miami Marlins (IL) players
Portland Beavers players
Sacramento Solons players
Salt Lake City Bees players
San Francisco Seals (baseball) players
Syracuse Chiefs players
Vancouver Mounties players
Yakima Bears players